The 2016 season was the Portland Thorns FC's fourth season of existence in the National Women's Soccer League (NWSL), the top division of women's soccer in the United States. The Thorns finished first, winning the NWSL Shield, an improvement over their sixth-place finish in the 2015 season. They lost their opening game of the 2016 NWSL Championship tournament (playoffs).

Background

Season review

April
The Thorns began their season at Providence Park as they faced off against expansion team Orlando Pride in the latter's inaugural match.  Former Thorn Steph Catley was able to strike first for Orlando in the 12th minute.  Portland would soon respond with goals from Dagný Brynjarsdóttir in the 25th minute and Linsey Horan in the 81st minute.  Both goals would be assisted by captain Tobin Heath.  Thorns FC would win their home opener 2-1.

For their last match in April, the Thorns traveled to Kansas City where they would receive a 1-1 draw.  Shea Groom was able to strike first with a goal in the 30th minute; however, Lindsey Horan was able to level for the Thorns in the 78th minute, again assisted by Tobin Heath.

Position at the end of April

May
The Thorns began their month of May continuing their 4-game road spell against the Boston Breakers where Dagný Brynjarsdóttir scored the lone goal and Tobin Heath continued her assist streak to 4 in a row.  The Thorns would end up winning 1-0.

The Thorns traveled to D.C. to take on the Washington Spirit. The team would end up drawing 0-0 with Tobin Heath acquiring two yellow cards, thus suspending her for the next match against local rivals Seattle Reign FC.

The Thorns finished their 4 away matches in Seattle as they faced off against Reign FC.  Nadia Nadim would score her first of the season with an assist by Meg Morris; however, Seattle would respond within 3 minutes by a goal from Beverly Yanez, equalizing at 1-1.  Both teams would settle for the draw.

In the first of a two-game home stand, the Thorns secured a 3-1 win over the then-first-place Washington Spirit. In their last game of the month, missing 6 starters due to USWNT call-ups, the Thorns played Seattle to a 0-0 draw.

Position at the end of May

June
The Thorns began June with a two-game road trip, first holding on for a 1-1 draw with Chicago Red Stars and then prevailing 2-0 over Western New York Flash. French international Amandine Henry made her first appearance as a Thorn as a second-half substitute in that game.

The Thorns played a crucial match against Chicago Red Stars to determine who would remain in first place.  The Thorns prevailed with a 2-0 win with goals from Christine Sinclair and Nadia Nadim with an assist from Henry, who also started for the first time for the club.

Continuing their unbeaten streak (11 games without a loss from the beginning of the season to the end of June), the Thorns traveled to Florida to take on Orlando Pride.  The Thorns would win it 2-1, with goals from Dagný Brynjarsdóttir and Lindsey Horan.

Position at the end of June

July
The Thorns opened July play without 6 starters due to USWNT and CanWNT Olympics preparations for a home game against Sky Blue. Amandine Henry would join the French national team after the game. The starting lineup included players who previously had seen limited professional minutes or even earning her first start. Sky Blue scored first and the Thorns came back to win 2-1 with goals from Dagný and Nadim to extend their season-opening unbeaten streak to 12 games.

For their second match for the month, the Thorns took on FC Kansas City at home.  Now without 7 starting players and using their new amateur players (via a rule that allowed a team to bring in non-paid players when national players go on duty), the Thorns would suffer their first loss of the season, falling 2-1 with the only Thorns goal scorer being Kat Williamson, who was assisted by Dagný Brynjarsdóttir.

The Thorns then went on the road and continuing the stretch without their Olympians, this time also without Dagný as well, lost 3-0 to the 9th-place Houston Dash.

In their last game of both July and before the league-wide Olympics break, the Thorns hosted Seattle Reign at Providence Park. Playing their first 5-4-1 formation of the season, Mana Shim passed to Nadia Nadim who headed home the game's only goal and the Thorns remained in 1st place.

Position at the end of July

August 
Due to the Olympic Games in Brazil, NWSL did not schedule games most of the month. The Thorns traveled to Seattle at the end of the month and fell 3-1 to the Reign.

Position at the end of August

September 
The Thorns started off their final month in NWSL League play on a busy week with 3 matches in 7 days.  The team, fully reunited after the Olympics, hosted Boston Breakers where the Thorns took a dominating 5-1 victory, keeping them in the race for the NWSL Shield.

Continuing their busy week, Portland Thorns took on Houston Dash. In the 19th minute, Portland fans and team members learned from a message on the big screen that they had clinched a playoff berth with Seattle Reign's loss to Washington Spirit.  The Thorns started off strong with a brace from Allie Long in the 26th and 71st minute, both goals assisted by Tobin Heath.  Christine Sinclair would finish up by scoring in the 90th minute and shutting out Houston 3-0, giving goalkeeper Michelle Betos 4 clean sheets for the season so far.

To conclude the stretch of 3 games in 8 days, the Thorns played the Western New York Flash in front of their only sold-out crowd of the year, with 21,144 announced attendance. The Thorns went ahead 3-0 only to concede 2 goals within 4 minutes late in the game, but hung on to win and clinch a home playoff match.

On Sunday September 25, the Thorns clinched the NWSL Shield with a win over Sky Blue FC and a Washington Spirit loss to the Chicago Red Stars.  The Thorns hosted Western New York Flash in the semi-finals for the NWSL Playoffs, losing a physical match 4-3 in overtime.

Position at the end of the season

Competitions

NWSL

Preseason
Providence Park Pre-season Tournament

Regular season

The 2016 NWSL Regular Season schedule was released on February 18, 2016.

Results by round

Home/away results

League table

NWSL Playoffs

Club

Executive staff

Coaching staff

Stadiums

Kits

Primary kit
The 2016 primary kits are their signature red color with a "spray on" black on the ends of the sleeves.  The kits remain Nike and the sponsorship with their sponsor Providence Health and Services on the front.

Secondary kit
The 2016 secondary kits feature the same style as the first kit, however instead of red, it is white with the "spray on" black sleeve style.  The kit is also Nike and shows the Providence Health and Services sponsorship.

Third kit
The Thorns do not have a third kit for 2016.

First Team

Roster
All players contracted to the club during the season included.
Last updated: August 30, 2016

 (HG) = Homegrown Player
 (NTA) = National Team Allocated Player
 (Loan) = On Loan
 (AP) = Amateur Player

Squad statistics
Source: NWSL

Squad statistics are of regular season only

Player transactions

National Team Player Allocation

Transfers in

Loans in

Loans out

Transfers out

Contract extensions

National Women's Soccer League College Draft 

The draft was held on January 15, 2016.

Staff in

Staff out

National team participation 
Ten Thorns players have been called up to play for their national teams during this season.

Statistics

Appearances

Goalkeeper stats

Line-up

Top scorers
The list is sorted by shirt number when total goals are equal.

Top assists
The list is sorted by shirt number when total assists are equal.

Clean sheets
The list is sorted by shirt number when total appearances are equal.

Summary

Honors

NWSL Player of the Month

NWSL Weekly Awards

NWSL Player of the Week

NWSL Goal of the Week

NWSL Save of the Week

See also
 2016 National Women's Soccer League season

References

External links

 

Portland Thorns FC
Portland Thorns FC seasons
Portland Thorns FC
Portland Thorns FC
Portland